Lakshmi is a 2014 Indian Hindi-language biographical social problem film written and directed by Nagesh Kukunoor. It stars Monali Thakur as the title character alongside Shefali Shah, Ram Kapoor, Satish Kaushik and Kukunoor. The film deals with the harsh realities of human trafficking and child prostitution, which continue behind closed curtains in rural areas of India. 

The film Won Best Film - Mercedes Benz Audience Award, for Best Narrative at the Palm Springs International Film Festival on 13 January 2014. It was earlier expected to release on 17 January 2014, but got delayed due to censorship issues. The film released on 21 March 2014. The film was screened official selection at Toronto Reel World, Washington DC, New York Indian and Melbourne Indian Film Festivals. It would open the 16th London Asian Film Festival in June 2014.

Plot
Lakshmi, a 14-year-old girl, is kidnapped from her village by Chinna (Nagesh Kukunoor) and brought to Hyderabad. She is taken to the home of Chinna's elder brother and boss, Reddy, where she first naively assumes the role of a domestic worker, helping the much older existing maid Amma. However, she is later raped by Reddy himself. The next day, Chinna takes Lakshmi to a brothel managed by Jyothi, who is both a reassuring and oppressive figure to the girls. After her first night, Lakshmi manages to run away to a nearby police station, but her complaint falls on deaf ears since Reddy has paid off the local police force. Thrown into this horrific, inhuman world, she survives with the help of the other girls and her own will to never give in. She forms a close friendship with her roommate at the brothel Suvarna, who walks her through the realities of life.

It is revealed that Jyothi works for Reddy in order to fund her daughters college education and plans to retire as soon as she graduates. At the brothel, Lakshmi meets Uma, a kind hearted woman who periodically brings the girls sanitary items, condoms and sweets. While servicing a client at his home, Lakshmi tries to escape but is caught and punished by Chinna. She develops an infection due to the injury and is nursed by Jyothi and Survana, but is ultimately forced to work again, when a client demands a young girl. The client turns out to be an undercover agent Mohan who operates with the help of Jyothi and Uma, and Reddy and Chinna are arrested. 
The girls are taken to a women's shelter where Lakshmi recovers but the case against Reddy stagnates since no one is willing to testify against him. The brothel is reopened and one by one, the women slowly return, until Lakshmi is the only one left at the shelter.

Against all odds, Lakshmi shows courage where everybody else fails. Her lawyer is in retirement due to having previously suffered a nervous breakdown, and initially refuses to take the case. He believes that Lakshmi will not be able to withstand the immense stress of the case, since she is the only witness against a powerful trafficking syndicate. Resisting all pressure - violent threats, coercion and bribes, she stands up in court. Her testimony reveals that her father sold her to a local politician, who in turn sold her to Reddy. At the brothel, Chinna beats and tortures Jyothi as punishment for her betrayal, and also reveals to Jyothi's daughter that she works there. Later that night, Jyothi castrates Chinna and slits her own wrists, resulting in them both bleeding to death. The trial results in a landmark judgement in India, succeeding in putting the traffickers behind bars.

Cast 
 Monali Thakur as Bangaru Lakshmi
 Shefali Shah as Jyoti
 Ram Kapoor as Avinash, Lakshmi's Advocate
 Satish Kaushik as Ram Reddy
 Nagesh Kukunoor as Chinna
 Gulfam Khan as Corporator Radha
 Asha Saini as Suvarna
 Vibha Chibber as Amma
 Vinita Joshi Thakkar as Asha
 Priyankaa Vir as Uma didi
 Ramkrishna Shenoy as Mohan
 Sumit Sharma as Opposition Lawyer
 Raju as Bangaru Raju, Lakshmi's father
 Subhash Gupta as Dr Murli
 Suresh Kumar as Judge
 Karan Pamnani as Inspector
Tejeswani Vellicharla as Police woman

Production
Director Nagesh Kukunoor was inspired to make the film after visiting some NGOs in India, where he met victims of human trafficking.

The film is produced by both Nagesh Kukunoor, his long-time collaborator Elahe Hiptoola who worked with him on all his films since Hyderabad Blues, and also by renowned actor Satish Kaushik. Kaushik stated the marketing campaign for the film was geared towards keeping "in tandem with the theme of the movie." The producers are planning to have private screenings of the film for Non-Governmental Organizations to promote awareness of the heinous crimes depicted in the film. They also hoped the film would be backed and sponsored by actor Salman Khan, who runs his own personal NGO called Being Human.

Kukunoor initially sought a 14-year girl as the lead but later dropped the idea of casting a minor. He later auditioned Monali Thakur for the same. The film was shot in 22 days on location, entirely in Hyderabad.

The trailer for the film was released on 21 October 2013.

The songs have been written by Manoj Yadav and composed by Tapas Relia. The four songs are 1) Sun Sugana Re sung by Suchi and Ankita Joshi 2) Sun Ri baavli sung by Papon 3) Aa Ghar Chale Hum sung by Monali Thakur and 4) Hain Reham Hain Karam sung by Kailash Kher.

Soundtrack

The soundtrack of Lakshmi comprises 4 songs composed by Tapas Relia with the lyrics being written by Manoj Yadav.

Release and reception
The film was first viewed by the Central Board of Film Certification (CBFC) in November 2013, which found some scenes "objectionable" and slated it to be next viewed by a revising committee. However, till early January the film did not receive a viewing by committee and thus missed its 17 January Indian premiere date.

Ahead of its release in India, the film has its premiere on 13 January, at the 2014 Palm Springs International Film Festival, where it received critical acclaim and won the Audience Award for Best narrative feature, which is based on viewers' votes.

References

External links
 

2014 films
Indian drama films
Films about prostitution in India
Films about child prostitution
Films about human trafficking in India
Films about rape in India
Films about women in India
Films scored by Tapas Relia
Films directed by Nagesh Kukunoor
2014 drama films
2010s Hindi-language films
Hindi-language drama films
Films shot in Hyderabad, India
Films set in Hyderabad, India